Munshi Pulia is a Lucknow Metro station in Lucknow, India. It is a northern terminus of the metro line between Munshi Pulia and Lucknow airport and metro station is situated in the Sector-13, 14 and 16 of Indira Nagar colony. There are two entrances to the station, from the Sector-16 side and from the Sector-13 and 14 side.

The metro fare is Rs 40 from Munshi Puliya to Charbag Railway station as against Rs 150–200 by taxi. To Munshi Pulia to Airport is Rs 60 while a taxi will charge around Rs 400 to 500.

Station layout

Entry/Exit

References

Lucknow Metro stations